Duygu Asena (19 April 1946 – 30 July 2006) was a Turkish journalist, best-selling author and activist for women's rights.

Biography
She was born in Istanbul as the daughter of Nihal and Muhtar Asena. His father was in the sesame business. His grandfather is CHP Gümüşhane deputy Ali Şevket Öndersev. The poet İnci Asena is also her sister. After completing her secondary education at Kadıköy Private Girls' College, she studied at Istanbul University Pedagogy Department. Starting her career as a pedagogue, Asena worked at Haseki Hospital Children's Clinic and Istanbul University Children's House. Her first article in the newspaper was published in the Butterfly supplement of the Hurriyet newspaper in 1972. Since then, she has been a journalist and manager in various magazines and newspapers. She was the editor-in-chief of Kadınca magazine, one of the most important women's magazines in Turkey, between 1978 and 1992. She also served as Kim magazine.  She prepared and presented a program called Ondan Sonra (After That) on TRT-2 television channel (1992–1997). 

Continuing her writing as well as journalism, Asena made a name for herself with her first book, Kadının Adı Yok. The book was banned in 1988 because it was considered obscene. After a long lawsuit, it was allowed to be re-released and then filmed by director Atıf Yılmaz in the same year. Because of her writings and the themes she touched on in her books, Asena became known as a feminist writer. Asena died on 30 July 2006 at the VKV American Hospital, where she was being treated for a brain tumor. She was buried in Zincirlikuyu Cemetery. Turkey P.E.N. The Writers' Association awarded Duygu Asena an award for her services to the Turkish women's movement in 2006 and gave the first award to İpek Çalışlar for her biography of Latife Hanım.

Duygu Asena Awards are still being given. In 2022, Seray Şahiner was deemed worthy of this award for her novel "Ülker Abla".

Bibliography
 Kadının Adı Yok (The Woman Has No Name), 184 pp., 1987, 59th edition 2004,  (also in Greek and Italian)
 Aslında Aşk da Yok (Actually, There Is Also No Love), 192 pp., 1989, 40th edition 2004, 
 Kahramanlar Hep Erkek (Heroes Are Always Men), 160 pp., 1992, 23rd edition 2005, 
 Değişen Bir Şey Yok (There Is Nothing Changed), 118pp., 1994, 43rd edition 2004, 
 Aynada Aşk Vardı (There was Love in the Mirror), 360 pp., 1997, 22nd edition 2004, 
 Aslında Özgürsün (Actually, You Are Free), 276 pp., 2001, 21st edition 2004, 
 Aşk Gidiyorum Demez (Love Does Not Say ‘I Am Leaving’), 208 pp., 2003, 14th edition 2003, 
 Paramparça (Torn in Pieces), 157 pp., 2004, 14th edition 2006, 
German language
 Die Frau hat keinen Namen (The Woman Has No Name), 174 pp., 1992, Piper, München, 
 Meine Liebe, Deine Liebe (My Love, Your Love), 215 pp., 1994, Piper, München, 
Dutch language
 De vrouw heeft geen naam (The Woman Has No Name), 219 pp., 2005, de Kern, 
 Eigenlijk ben je vrij (Actually, You Are Free), 222 pp., 2005, de Kern,

Awards
 1988 – "People at the Summit" by Magazine "Nokta"
 1988 – "Best Author" by Boğaziçi University for Kadının Adı Yok
 1995 – "Best Author" by Boğaziçi University
 1998 – "75 Women in 75 Years" Award

References

External links
 

20th-century Turkish women writers
20th-century Turkish writers
21st-century Turkish women writers
1946 births
2006 deaths
Burials at Zincirlikuyu Cemetery
Cumhuriyet people
Deaths from brain cancer in Turkey
Istanbul University alumni
Milliyet people
Turkish magazine founders
Turkish women's rights activists
Turkish women journalists
Writers from Istanbul